In computing, Sharity is a program to allow a Unix system to mount SMB fileshares. It is developed by Christian Starkjohann of Objective Development Software GmbH and is proprietary software. , the current version is 3.9.

Linux (using  or ), and FreeBSD, NetBSD, and macOS (using ), can mount SMB natively. Most other Unix and Unix-like operating systems cannot. In the proprietary Unix world, Sharity is a common solution to mounting SMB shares, as the usual recommended workaround — to run Services for UNIX on the Windows file server and make the share available via NFS — is frequently unreliable in practice.

Sharity works by making an external SMB share appear to the kernel as an NFS-mounted file system.

The program runs on the following Unix and Unix-like operating systems: macOS, IRIX, Solaris, HP-UX, FreeBSD, NetBSD, OpenBSD, BSD/OS, Tru64, AIX, NEXTSTEP, OpenStep, UnixWare, SunOS 4, and Linux.

Sharity-Light was originally called Rumba (a pun on "Samba"), but the name was trademarked to another company. Sharity-Light runs in user space rather than kernel space.

References

 smbfs support (OpenSolaris RFE forums)
 SMB Filesystem Driver (OpenSolaris BugDatabase)
 Mounting an SMB share on Solaris. (Solaris x86 FAQ)

External links
 Sharity

Internet Protocol based network software
Unix network-related software